Legends of the Lost Realm is a 1989 video game published by Avalon Hill for the Macintosh.

Gameplay
Legends of the Lost Realm is a game in which an ancient castle has recently been taken back by those who believe in the High Kings.

Reception
Dennis Owens reviewed the game for Computer Gaming World, and stated that "despite its problems, Legends of the Lost Realm is a fascinating, complex, and rewarding gaming experience. It is a must buy for all Mac users who are desperately wailing for role-playing games and intricate adventures."

Macworld inducted Legends of the Lost Realm into its 1990 Game Hall of Fame in the Best Role-Playing Game category, calling the game a "role-playing epic that tops Wizardry."

References

1989 video games
Avalon Hill video games
Classic Mac OS games
Classic Mac OS-only games
Fantasy video games
Role-playing video games
Video games developed in the United States